Sickte is a municipality in the district of Wolfenbüttel, in Lower Saxony, Germany. It is situated west of the Elm, approx. 10 km northeast of Wolfenbüttel, and 10 km southeast of Braunschweig.

Sickte is the seat of the Samtgemeinde ("collective municipality") Sickte.

References

Wolfenbüttel (district)